Aubert Lemeland (19 December 1932 – 15 November 2010) was a French composer.

Life 
Born in La Haye-du-Puits, after his studies in piano and cello classes in Cherbourg, then in Paris - where he moved in 1948 - and interrupted by a long illness, Lemeland produced his first works in the mid-1960s.
Lemeland died in Paris at the age of 77. He is buried at Père Lachaise Cemetery (22nd division).

Works 
His latest creations (2008/2010), include the 11th symphony, by the Rouen Philharmonic Orchestra, conducted by Oswald Sallaberger, two tales by Grimm by the soloists of the Ensemble Orchestral de Paris (now Orchestre de chambre de Paris), Épitaphe française, concerto pour orgue, orchestre à cordes et trompette, by Hervé Désarbre, Eric Planté and the French Republican Guard Band, conducted by Sébastien Billiard.

Bibliography

References

External links 
 Discography on Discogs
 Aubert Lemeland (YouTube)

1932 births
2010 deaths
People from Manche
20th-century French composers
French opera composers
French male composers
Burials at Père Lachaise Cemetery
20th-century French male musicians